Peniscola Castle is a castle in Peniscola, Castellón, Valencian Community, Spain. The castle is restored and is open to the public.

History
The earliest evidence of habitation in the area were Ibero-Roman remains excavated in the port of Peniscola; they date to the 1st–2nd centuries BC. Arab writer Al-Idrisi described Baniskula in the 11th century AD, and briefly described a Moorish castle overlooking the sea. There are no detailed descriptions until the 13th century, when James I of Aragon briefly summarised the Muslim defences. The castle was transferred to James's control in April 1229, after the last Almohad governor of Valencia, Zayd Abu Zayd, signed an accord surrendering various castles in eastern Spain.

The current form of the castle is essentially that developed by the Knights Templar, who planned to develop a kingdom centred on Peniscola. James II of Aragon gave the castle to the Templars in 1294, together with the nearby castles of Pulpís and Xivert. The Templars began work that year, demolished the Muslim fortifications, and completely rebuilt the castle; the work was completed in 1307. In common with other Templar fortifications, the castle was laid out around an inner ward and possessed a chapel. Architectural features included barrel vaulting and round arches. The basic Templar core of the castle remains intact; some changes were made by Antipope Benedict XIII in order to modify it for use as a papal residence in the early 15th century. The castle defences and the associated town fortifications were significantly upgraded from the early 16th century onwards, in line with advances in military technology. The castle was massively redeveloped by military engineer Giovanni Battista Antonelli in the 16th century.

The castle was involved in various military conflicts of the Kingdom of Aragon, and later in the War of the Spanish Succession in the early 18th century, the Peninsula War and civil conflicts in the early 19th century, each of which impacted upon the state of the castle defences in some form. The castle garrison was finally disbanded in 1890.

The castle where Benedict lived from 1417 until his death in 1423 was restored, improved and new walls were added in 1960 when Anthony Mann's film El Cid was partially filmed there. The town and castle of Peníscola played the role of Valencia. The castle is now a popular tourist attraction and the beaches and surrounding area are a popular family holiday resort.

Notes

References

Barros da Rocha e Costa, Hugo (2013) "Historia de la representación gráfica del Castillo de Peñíscola: del grafito al láser". (in Spanish). Doctoral thesis. Valencia, Spain: Escuela Técnica Superior de Arquitectura, Universitat Politècnica de València. 
Falomir Granell, Ferran; María Josefa Balaguer Dezcallar (2017) "Arqueología del Castillo de Peñíscola. Resultados de la intervención en las dependencias de la Planta Baja y Planta Principal en el marco del proyecto de rehabilitación de la fortaleza". (in Spanish) Quaderns de prehistòria i arqueologia de Castelló, 35, pp. 229–252. Castelló de la Plana, Spain: Servei d'Investigacions Arqueològiques i Prehistòriques. ISSN 1137-0793. .
Gusi, Francesc; María Angeles Fernández, and Mariá Asunción Fernández (2008) "El patrimonio histórico de Castellón y su explotación turística: perspectivas de futuro". (in Spanish) Quaderns de prehistòria i arqueologia de Castelló, 26, pp. 169–196. Castelló de la Plana, Spain: Servei d'Investigacions Arqueològiques i Prehistòriques. ISSN 1137-0793. .

Castles in the Valencian Community
Castles and fortifications of the Knights Templar
Bien de Interés Cultural landmarks in the Province of Castellón